This is a list of caves and cave systems in the state of New South Wales, Australia.

Caves
Abercrombie Caves
Ashford Caves
Bendethera Caves
Billys Creek Caves
Borenore Caves
Bungonia Caves
Careys Cave
Church Creek Caves
Colong Caves
Finchs Caves
Jenolan Caves (List of caves within the Jenolan Caves karst)
St Michaels Cave (Avalon Beach)
Mermaids Cave
Timor Caves
Tuglow Caves
Wee Jasper Caves
Wellington Caves
Willie Willie Caves
Wombeyan Caves
Wyanbene Caves
Yarrangobilly Caves

See also
List of caves in Australia

New South Wales
Caves